Idrissa Camara is a dancer and choreographer originating from Guinea in West Africa. He has made the UK his home and is founder and director of Ballet Nimba, an african dance theatre Company which he founded in 2010. Idrissa is also a  music recording artist having produced an album Sogay with his company's musicians and more recently he has turned his hand to film making producing the short documentary Fare Ta.

Ballet Nimba features traditional and contemporary West-African Dance and Music, with a strong presence in the Black Dance Sector.  Idrissa Camara was named as one of the top 10 people to meet at the 2010 Decibel Performing Arts Showcase, Arts Council England's biggest bi-annual event promoting diversity and equality in the Arts. In 2013 Idrissa Camara was awarded a Trailblazer Fellowship from the Association of Dance of the African Diaspora. These 2013-14 trailblazer bursaries were given "in recognition of creative spark, ambition and leadership potential".

In 2012 Ballet Nimba became recording artists with their first album "Saiyama", and performed on the world stage, headlining festivals in the UK and in Europe. Their album was digitally released in 2013. They were asked to attend the Trac Cymru programme for International Development in 2013 and subsequently were successful in being picked for the WOMEX legacy tour for October 2013.

In 2014 Ballet Nimba produced its first film, a Documentary Film by Idrissa Camara. It was first screened at Chapter Arts Centre in Cardiff at the Wales Dance Platform Event. It had its North American Premiere at the Silicon Valley African Film Festival where it won the award for Best Documentary Short.

Performances 
Ballet Nimba are self-styled ambassadors for West African Art and culture in the UK. The artists are from several West African nations and they have performed all over the UK at festivals, art centres and rural touring venues, most significantly at London's Southbank Centre and WOMAD's UK festivals. Their performances incorporate acrobatic dancing, traditional musicians and drama. Productions are based on traditional mythology but performed by young contemporary artists with an original sound track.

Productions 
Spirit Mask 2010
Saiyama and Payapaya 2011
BagaTai (Land of the Baga) 2012
Kobaya 2013 - a piece commissioned by MYDC for young people
Sagatala (Man) 2014 - a look at masculinity from a Guinean Perspective
Fare- Ta (Land of Dance) - a Documentary short film by Idrissa Camara
Ntokee (The Way you see me) 2014-15

Discography 
Sogay (Sunrise) 2012

References 

Guinean dancers
Guinean emigrants to Wales